Springside is a rural locality in the Toowoomba Region, Queensland, Australia.

History 
Springside State School opened on 6 February 1888. It closed in 1954.

St John's Anglican Church was dedicated in 1898 and closed circa 1974. The church building was relocated on the site of St Philip's at Mount Tyson for use as a Sunday school and later remodelled as a parish hall. It is now privately owned.

Education 
There are no schools in Springside, but primary and secondary schools are available in neighbouring Pittsworth.

References 

Toowoomba Region
Localities in Queensland